Itrocinonide (developmental code name D5159) is a synthetic glucocorticoid corticosteroid which was never marketed.

References

Secondary alcohols
Corticosteroid cyclic ketals
Cyclic acetals with aldehydes
Organofluorides
Glucocorticoids
Pregnanes
Abandoned drugs